Bedřich Šupčík (22 October 1898 – 11 July 1957) was a Czechoslovak gymnast and Olympic champion. He competed at the 1924 Summer Olympics in Paris, where he received a gold medal in rope climbing, and a bronze medal and in all-round individual. He received a silver medal in team combined exercises at the 1928 Summer Olympics in Amsterdam.

References

External links
 

1898 births
1957 deaths
20th-century Czech people
Czech male artistic gymnasts
Czechoslovak male artistic gymnasts
Gymnasts at the 1924 Summer Olympics
Gymnasts at the 1928 Summer Olympics
Olympic gymnasts of Czechoslovakia
Olympic gold medalists for Czechoslovakia
Olympic silver medalists for Czechoslovakia
Olympic bronze medalists for Czechoslovakia
Czech expatriate sportspeople in Austria
People from Baden District, Austria
Olympic medalists in gymnastics
Medalists at the 1928 Summer Olympics
Medalists at the 1924 Summer Olympics